AirTrack may refer to:

 Air track, a piece of scientific equipment for measuring uniformly accelerated motion
 Heathrow Airtrack, the original name for the proposed new UK rail links from Heathrow Airport's Terminal 5
 AirTrack in-flight entertainment system; see SimiGon
 Antonov AirTrack; see Antonov An-124
 An object in Japan animation and comic Air Gear